İleri is a Turkish surname. People with the surname include:

Celal Nuri İleri (1881–1938), Turkish writer and politician
Güler İleri (born 1948), Turkish female pharmacist and politician 
Gürbey İleri (born 1988), Turkish actor
Özgür İleri (born 1987), Turkish football player
Suphi Nuri İleri (1887–1945), Turkish politician and writer
Tevfik İleri (1911–1961), Turkish civil engineer, journalist and politician

Turkish-language surnames